Colonial National Bank, also known as Colonial American National Bank-Colonial Arms, is a historic bank and office building located at Roanoke, Virginia.  It was built in 1926–1927, and is a 12-story, granite and gray-enamel brick building in the Neoclassical style. The base is formed by the first three stories of regular granite ashlar; the shaft is formed by the next seven stories of unornamented gray-enamel brick; and the capital is formed by the last two stories which are ornamented.  The building has a three-story annex built in two stages in 1949 and 1959.  The building was Roanoke's tallest building for nearly fifty years.

The building's lower floors are where the bank's business traditionally was completed, while the ten upper floors were rented as offices. The granite exterior of the building is now home to apartments and the HomeTown Bank.

The building was listed on the National Register of Historic Places in 1983.

References

Bank buildings on the National Register of Historic Places in Virginia
Neoclassical architecture in Virginia
Commercial buildings completed in 1927
Buildings and structures in Roanoke, Virginia
National Register of Historic Places in Roanoke, Virginia
Individually listed contributing properties to historic districts on the National Register in Virginia